The 1992–93 Combined Counties Football League season was the 15th in the history of the Combined Counties Football League, a football competition in England.

The league was won by newcomers Peppard for the first time.

League table

The league remained at 19 clubs after Farnham Town were promoted to the Isthmian League and Malden Town resigned. Two new clubs joined:

D.C.A. Basingstoke, joining from the Hampshire League.
Peppard, joining from the Chiltonian League.
Godalming Town changed their name to Godalming & Guildford.

References

External links
 Combined Counties League Official Site

1992-93
1992–93 in English football leagues